The A 26 road is an A-Grade trunk road in Sri Lanka. It connects Kandy with Padiyathalawa.

The A 26 passes through Digana, Teldeniya, Medamahanuwara, Hunnasgiriya, Udadumbara, Mahiyangana and Belilgalla to reach Padiyathalawa.

It is well known for its 18 consecutive hairpin turns. This road is now expanding minimizing the bends by national highway sector project of Road Development Authority of Sri Lanka.

References

Highways in Sri Lanka